The Championnat de France de Supertourisme was a touring car racing championship organised by the Fédération Française du Sport Automobile between 1976 and 2005.

The championship was contested on several circuits around France, with points awarded for driver classification. The winning driver was the one with the most points at the end of the season.

A national title was given in 1974, but a proper touring car championship only started in 1976. The cars were run to Group 2 specification, and the championship was called the Championnat Français de Voiture de Tourisme (French Touring Car Championship). From 1982, Group A rules were adopted to replace the outgoing Group 2, but in 1983 the FFSA modified them to be loosely based on Group A, evolving into the 1987 and 1988 seasons, where Group B type machines, called "Superproduction," were allowed to run alongside Group A, dominating the series. The championship changed its name to Super Tourisme in 1989, when Group A cars were allowed technical evolutions to keep up with the faster Superproduction cars.

A major change happened in 1991, when the FFSA adopted a set of regulations similar to the British Touring Car Championship, with a maximum engine displacement of 2000 cm3. In 1993, these regulations were formally codified by the FIA as Supertouring D2 Class. All works teams abandoned the championship at the end of 1995 but the series soldiered on with privateers. To make up the numbers, rally kitcars were allowed on the grid.

In 2001, Supertouring cars were replaced in the series by silhouette cars. Despite the change of class, the series retained its name. The final season was held in 2005, when because of rising costs the championship was cancelled. Since then, the most prestigious French circuit championship has been the FFSA GT Championship.

Circuits (1976–2005)

  Autodrome de Linas-Montlhéry (1976–1988, 1990–1996)
  Circuit Bugatti (1976, 1978–1981, 1986, 1989–1994, 1998–2005)
  Circuit d'Albi (1976–1979, 1981–1997, 1999–2005)
  Circuit de Charade (1976, 1980–1986, 1990–1991, 1994–1996, 1998–1999)
  Circuit de Croix-en-Ternois (1976, 1980–1995, 1997, 2001)
  Circuit de Dijon-Prenois (1976–1987, 1989–1999, 2002–2005)
  Circuit de Folembray (1977)
  Circuit de la Châtre (1979–1981, 1983–1984, 1989)
  Circuit de Lédenon (1977–1980, 1982–1991, 1994, 1996–2005)
  Circuit de Monaco (1987)
  Circuit de Nevers Magny-Cours (1976–1987, 1989–1990, 1992–1994, 1997–2005)
  Circuit de Pau-Ville (1977–1983, 1986, 1988, 1990–1991, 1993–2005)
  Circuit de Rouen-Les-Essarts (1976–1978, 1980–1992)
  Circuit de Spa-Francorchamps (2000–2001)
  Circuit du Val de Vienne (1992–2000, 2005)
  Circuit Pau-Arnos (1987–1990)
  Circuit Paul Armagnac (1976–2005)
  Circuit Paul Ricard (1976–1980, 1982–1983, 1985–1989, 1993–1995, 1997–1998)
  Hockenheimring (1983)

Champions

References

External links 
 SuperTouring website
 SuperTouringRegister website
 SuperTouringCars website	
 

Touring car racing series
Supertouring Championship
1976 establishments in France
2005 disestablishments in France